Bare Knuckles is a 1977 blaxploitation film, starring Robert Viharo, Sherry Jackson and Gloria Hendry. The film was written and directed by Don Edmonds.

Plot
L.A. bounty hunter, Zachary Kane, is on the hunt for a masked serial killer on the loose.

Production
Director Edmonds said he didn't get any permits for the movie, it was made for $25,000 with another $25,000 spent for goods and services.

Legacy
It is one of the films that have inspired Quentin Tarantino, and it was selected by Tarantino himself to be shown at his Los Angeles Grindhouse Festival in 2007. In May 2008, it was being shown by Robert Viharo's son, Will, as part of his long-running Thrillville theater program.

Hip-hop duo Gangrene sampled the film's opening theme for the song "Breathing Down Yo Neck", featuring rapper MED, on their debut album Gutter Water.

Cast
 Robert Viharo — Zachary Kane
 Sherry Jackson — Jennifer Randall
 Michael Heit — Richard Devlin
 Gloria Hendry — Barbara Darrow
 John Daniels — Black
 Karen Kondazian — Pamela Devlin
 Essex Smith — Efrom
 Richard Kennedy — Police captain
 Patrick M. Wright — Max Baumer
 Jace — Kido
 Kyôko Fuji — Oriental Girl
 Valerie Rae Clark — Massage Girl
 John Dewey Carter — Deke
 James Freedman — Risso
 Amber Hunt — Rita

References

External links
 
 Brian Vs. Movies review

1977 films
1977 martial arts films
1970s action films
1970s adventure drama films
1977 crime drama films
1970s serial killer films
Blaxploitation films
American martial arts films
American independent films
American crime drama films
1970s English-language films
1970s American films